Paseka is a name with multiple etymologies. In parts of southern Africa, it comes from the Sesotho word for Easter. In some countries of central and eastern Europe, it means "glade, clearing" (Czech) or "apiary" (Russian), and is a cognate of Polish Pasieka.

Given name
Paseka Motsoeneng (born 1968), South African televangelist
Paseka Sekese (born 1994), South African football midfielder

Surname
 Malia Paseka (born 1994), New Zealand netball player
 Maria Paseka (born 1995), Russian artistic gymnast

References

See also